Khan Roshan Khan Yousafzai (November 1914 – 19 November 1988) was a Pashtun historian, educationalist, and writer from Pakistan known primarily for being president of the Muslim League in Swabi and for writing books on the history of the Pashtun people.

Biography
Khan Roshan Khan was born in the village of Nawa Killi, Swabi in 1914 and died on 19 November 1988. He was the son of Muhammad Zaman Khan. He wrote many books on the history of Pushtuns. He was a major figure in contemporary Pushto literature. Roshan Khan was an active member of the movement Khudai Khidmatgar. He was very energetic in the Pakistan Movement and was the president of the Muslim League in Swabi. An area in Swabi, called Roshan Pura is named after him, where his tomb is also located.

Career
Khan received his primary education from the Islami School Uthmanzai in Charsadda. Later on, he could not complete his further education due to the worsening conditions during the time of the British Government of India. The changing circumstances diverted his attention towards history. He wrote books on the history of Pathans. These books are Tazkira, Pathanon ki Tareekh aur in ki asliat which describes the races of Pashtun tribes and their origins. In addition, he wrote Yousafzai qaum ki sarguzisht, which gives details on the various tribes of Pukhtoons. Khan also authored Afghano ki nasli tarikh, which describes the origin of Afghans (Pashtuns) from Bani Israel, (that is, the theory that the Pashtuns are descended from the biblical Israelites). Other booklets include Malika-Sawat, Baba-e-qaum Sheikhmali (RA) among others. His most important work is Tawarikh-e-Hafiz Rehmat Khani, which includes the details about the biographies of prominent Pukhtoon leaders and elders like Hafiz Rehmat Khan, Hafiz Alpuri (Abdulsamad) of Shangla, Ahmed Shah Abdali, Sardar Mohammad Khan, Dost Muhammad Khan and many others. It also sheds light on the important events and wars of Pukhtoons with other empires and tribes. Moreover, all the family trees of Pashtun tribes are also discussed in this book. He also discussed the brief history of a famous Pashtun tribe, Shalmani.

Books written by Roshan Khan
Tawarikh-e Hafiz Rehmat Khani, 3rd Edition, 1977, Peshawar Pushtu Academy, Peshawar University.
Tazkarah (Pathano ki Asliyat aur in ki Tarikh), 1st Edition, 1980, Karachi Roshan Khan Education Trust.
Afghano ki Nasli Tarikh, 1st Edition, 1981, Karachi Roshan Khan and Company.
Yousafzai Qaum ki Sarguzisht, 1st Edition, 1986, Karachi Roshan Khan and Company.
Malika-e Swat, 1st Edition, 1983, Roshan Khan, Nawan Killi, Swabi District, Pakistan.
Baba-ye Qaum Sheikhmali (RA), 1st Edition, 1985, Roshan Khan and Company, Phool Chowk, Karachi, Pakistan.

Malika-e-Swat
The book Malika-e-Swat includes the story of the wedding of Mughal king Babur to the daughter Bibi Mubaraka Yousafzai of Malik Shahmansoor Yusufzai. This book also describes the events and the times when the Yousafzais entered Swat. Their life and the battles which took place between the king of Swat Sultan Awais and the Yusufzai Pashtuns. The book is mainly about the life and martyrdom of Shaheeda Bibi, who was the sister of Malik Ahmed and was the wife of the king of Swat, Sultan Awais. After her marriage with Sultan Awais she was called the Queen of Sawat.

References

External links
Avt Khyber,In the memory of Khan Roshan Khan.
yousafzai qaum ki sarguzisht
Tawarikh e hafiz rehmat khani
Afghano ki nasli tarikh
Tazkira

1914 births
1988 deaths
Historians of Pakistan
Historians of Afghanistan
20th-century Pakistani historians
Pashtun writers
Pashto-language writers
People from Swabi District
Recipients of the Pride of Performance
Leaders of the Pakistan Movement